Heidi is a 1965 Austrian family film directed by Werner Jacobs and starring Eva Maria Singhammer, Michaela May and Jan Koester. It is an adaptation of Johanna Spyri's 1880 novel of the same title.

The film's sets were designed by the art directors Fritz Jüptner-Jonstorff and Hans Zehetner. It was shot in Eastmancolor.

Plot summary
The eight-year-old child, Heidi (Eva Maria Singhammer), lives with her grandfather, Alp-Oehi (Gustav Knuth), in a cottage in the Swiss Alps and enjoys spending time in the mountains with Peter, her friend the goatherd (Jan Koester), who believes that one has to choose between either living in the Alps and herding goats or learning to read. 

The village parson (Rudolph Prack) calls in on Alp-Oehi. He asks him to come to the village along with Heidi to attend the installation of the new church bell. A festival is held around the installation of the bell. Traditionally, the children help hoist up the new bell, and Heidi should be part of the event. In addition, she could make friends with the children of the village, because soon she would start going to school in the village, anyway. The child should have already been enrolled in school by law. Alp-Oehi protests: Heidi cannot go to school every day in the winter while facing snow storms and the cold. The parson agrees and suggests that Alp-Oehi could return and live in the village. However, Alp-Oehi is not thrilled because he is at odds with the villagers. In the past, they accused him of being responsible for a fire which damaged many houses and the church tower. But, actually, Alp-Oehi was innocent and even lost his only son, Heidi's father, while the latter was fighting the fire. Shortly thereafter, Heidi's mother died from grief over the loss. Aunt Dete (Lotte Ledl), the sister of Heidi's mother, took initially care of the child. However, she entrusted her to the old man when she got a job in Frankfurt in Germany. 

Heidi lives happily with her grandfather. She even convinces him to attend the festival so she could help the other children hoist up the new bell. At the end of the village’s festival, Brigitte (uncredited), Peter's mother, is surprised to see Alp-Oehi next to her house. Heidi’s grandfather suggests then that "someone" (implying, in a non-explicit manner, himself) could repair the two uninhabited rooms she possesses next to her house, so this "someone" could live there during the winter. 
Aunt Dete travels from Frankfurt to the Swiss village where she meets Alp-Oehi while he is repairing the rooms he intended to live in with Heidi during the winter.
Dete is employed at the Sesemann house as a cook. Alfred Sesemann (Ernst Schröder), a wealthy businessman and a widower, is seeking a companion for his daughter Klara (Michaela May). Klara, a sick teenager, uses a wheelchair after an illness. Dete thinks Heidi could be that companion for Klara.
During her brief meeting with Alp-Oehi, she asks the old man to let her take Heidi with her to Frankfurt, where the child will receive a good education and will keep Klara company. Alp-Oehi knows that this city life will not fit Heidi and rejects Dete's suggestion. Nevertheless, Dete deceives Brigitte, Alp-Oehi, a villager and Heidi. She returns to Frankfurt by train, taking the child with her. Aunt Dete makes Heidi believe she could come back to her village whenever she wanted as soon as she finds a new pipe for her grandpa. Informed by Brigitte, the Alp-Oehi tries to stop them, but it is too late.

At Alfred Sesemann's mansion, Heidi gets along well with Klara and helps her in every way. However, Heidi's spirited manner continually infuriates Klara's rigid governess, Miss Rottenmeier (Margot Trooger). The latter is outraged when she notices that the eight-year-old child does not know how to read. She regards with contempt her country-way of expressing herself. Heidi declares she does not want to learn to read because it will prevent her from rambling in the mountains she loves so much. And Miss Rottenmeier cannot make her change her mind because of the antagonism the governess establishes between her and Heidi. 
The other members of the household staff grow very fond of Heidi, especially Sebastian (Rudolf Vogel) the butler. 
All the while, as Aunt Dete promised, Heidi hopes to be allowed to return to her beloved mountains and live again with her grandfather.
One day, Heidi leaves the mansion, walks to the cathedral and climbs up to its tower to see her mountains, but to no avail.
Meanwhile, at Mr. Sesemann's mansion, her absence is discovered. The governess, Miss Rottenmeier, is profoundly upset. The whole household is in an uproar. When Heidi returns, Miss Rottenmeier demands explanations and suddenly understands: Dete had tricked the child, so she would follow her to Frankfurt. Heidi also understands that her aunt had played her a bad trick.
Mrs. Sesemann (Margarete Haagen), Klara's grandmother, convinces Heidi to learn to read. The governess softens her behavior towards the child. 
Days are passing by and Mrs. Sesemann writes a letter to Alp-Oehi telling him that Heidi is learning fast and seems to be happy among them. Alp-Oehi thinks that Heidi has forgotten him, forgotten them.

Eventually a miracle occurs: Klara, helped by Heidi, begins to walk again. When Alfred Sesemann returns from a long business trip, he is moved and overjoyed when he sees his child making a few steps towards him. Doctor Classen (Rolf Möbius) tells him that Heidi accomplished this miracle. Out of gratitude, Alfred Sesemann decides the child shall stay indefinitely with them as his second daughter. This decision secretly throws Heidi into despair because of her homesickness. Heidi gets ill. Doctor Classen convinces the businessman to send Heidi back to her grandfather because her illness is caused by her homesickness. 
Alfred Sesemann agrees, although reluctantly. It is furthermore decided that Klara shall visit Heidi soon during the holidays. Heidi's grandfather is not informed of the child's return: it must remain a surprise. 

At the village, Heidi arrives and visits first Brigitte, Peter's mother, who lives in the village. Aunt Dete, who accompanies her, prefers not to meet the old man who certainly holds a grudge against her. Meanwhile, the parson meets Alp-Oehi in his cottage, up there on the mountain. He asks him to attend the upcoming Sunday church service and make peace with the villagers. Alp-Oehi's response is: only if a miracle occurs.

Heidi returns home with a new pipe for her grandpa. Finally, this return resolves the conflict between Alp-Oehi and the villagers. On Sunday, Heidi and her grandfather join the villagers for church service.

Cast
 Eva Maria Singhammer as Heidi  
 Michaela May as Klara Sesemann  
 Jan Koester as Geißenpeter  
 Gustav Knuth as Alp-Oehi, Heidi's Großvater  
 Margot Trooger as Fräulein Rottenmeier  
 Ernst Schröder as Konsul Alfred Sesemann  
 Rudolf Prack as Pfarrer 
 Lotte Ledl as Tante Dete 
 Margarete Haagen as Großmama Sesemann  
 Rolf Möbius as Dr. Rudolf Classen  
 Gabriele Buch as Rosi  
 Rudolf Vogel as Sebastian  
 Hans Thimig as Dompförtner  
 Michael Janisch as Johann

References

Bibliography 
 Goble, Alan. The Complete Index to Literary Sources in Film. Walter de Gruyter, 1999.

External links 
 
 

1965 films
1965 drama films
Austrian drama films
Austrian children's films
1960s German-language films
Films directed by Werner Jacobs
Heidi films
1960s children's films
Constantin Film films
Sascha-Film films